Kin of IRRE-like protein 3 (KIRREL3) also known as kin of irregular chiasm-like protein 3 or NEPH2 is a protein that in humans is encoded by the KIRREL3 gene.

NEPH2 is a member of the NEPH protein family of transmembrane proteins, which includes NEPH1 (KIRREL) and NEPH3 (KIRREL2). The NEPH proteins can interact with nephrin and CASK.

Function 
NEPH2 has been implicated in synapse formation. Disruption of KIRREL3 gene function had been associated with abnormal brain function.

NEPH1 and NEPH2 are involved in the blood filtration function of the kidney and are located in the slit diaphragm.

References

Further reading